The Foster Home, also known as Cedar Hill or Sylvan Plantation, in Tuscaloosa, Alabama, was listed on the National Register of Historic Places in 1985.

Built as the main residence and headquarters of a large slave-labor cotton farm, the main house is an east-facing two-story weatherboarded house, constructed of heart pine upon a brick pier foundation. Erected around 1825, it is an I-house with a one-story, two-room ell at the south rear.

It is located off US 11 south of Tuscaloosa.

Enclosed by a cast-iron fence, it contains graves of Robert Savidge
Foster, his wife Ann Tompkins Foster, and those of several children and other family members.  It has the grave of Wade Foster, a co-founder in 1856 of the Sigma Alpha Epsilon Fraternity at the University of Alabama.

See also
Pinehurst Historic District, Tuscaloosa, which has two "Foster House"s

References

Plantations in Alabama
National Register of Historic Places in Tuscaloosa County, Alabama
Buildings and structures completed in 1825
I-houses in Alabama